Lincoln Raudonikis is an Australian former professional rugby league footballer who played in the 1990s. He played for the Western Suburbs Magpies in the NRL.

Background
Raudonikis is the son of Western Suburbs legend and team of the century member Tommy Raudonikis.

Playing career
Raudonikis made his first grade debut for Western Suburbs in Round 6 against South Sydney at the Sydney Football Stadium which ended in a 41–10 loss.  Western Suburbs would go on to finish the 1998 season in last place winning only 4 games for the entire year but were handed the wooden spoon as the Gold Coast Chargers who had also finished bottom avoided last position due to a better for and against.

In 1999, Raudonikis played 8 games for the club in what proved to be their last season in the top grade as a stand-alone entity.    
Raudonikis played in the club's last game before their merger with fellow foundation club Balmain.  Raudonikis played at prop as Wests were defeated 60-16 by the Auckland Warriors at Campbelltown Stadium.  Western Suburbs would also finish last in 1999 winning only 3 games and conceded 944 points throughout the season which was an average of 39.33 per game, the most in league history.

Following the 1999 season, Raudonikis was not offered a contract to play with the newly formed Wests Tigers.

References

Western Suburbs Magpies players
Australian rugby league players
1977 births
Rugby league second-rows
Rugby league props
Rugby league players from Sydney
Living people